Chong Hua Hospital is a hospital in Cebu City, Philippines.

In 2009, it became the first hospital outside Luzón and third in the Philippines to be accredited by Joint Commission International. The hospital had been able to keep its agency accreditation until 2015.

Chong Hua has 660 bed capacity and is located near the Fuente Osmeña Circle, a city landmark.

See also 
List of hospitals in the Philippines

References

External links 
Official website of Chong Hua Hospital
Promotional video of Chong Hua Hospital

Buildings and structures in Cebu City
Hospitals in the Philippines